Arthur "Artie" Fields (April 13, 1922 – October 14, 2009) was an American bandleader, songwriter, record producer and jazz trumpeter.

Fields was born in Brooklyn, New York, United States. After his family moved to Ann Arbor, Michigan, and then later to Dearborn, Michigan,  he attended Cass Technical High School in Detroit and began playing music locally.  In the late 1950s, he led an orchestra at Detroit's Fortune Records.  In 1967, he opened Artie Fields Productions in the old Alhambra Theater at 9428 Woodward Avenue in Detroit as well as Top Dog Records, located in the same building.

Fields recorded songs in the 1970s for several American pop bands, as well as other recording artists, including the MC5, Parliament-Funkadelic, the Ohio Players, the Detroit Emeralds, the Fantastic Four, Don Rondo, and Larry Santos.  He also recorded the vocals for the 1973 Gladys Knight #1 hit single "Midnight Train To Georgia".  Fields wrote and recorded the 1968 World Series Champion Detroit Tigers theme song "Go Get Em, Tigers" (sung by Don Rondo and Kris Peterson).  Fields also wrote and recorded the famous Ziebart "It's Us, Or Rust" jingle (sung by Don Rondo).

Fields died in West Bloomfield, Michigan on October 14, 2009, at age 87.

References

1922 births
2009 deaths
American bandleaders
American male songwriters
Record producers from Michigan
Musicians from Detroit
Songwriters from Michigan
People from Ann Arbor, Michigan
People from Dearborn, Michigan
People from Southfield, Michigan
20th-century male musicians
Cass Technical High School alumni